SS (RMS) Tynwald (II), No. 45474, was an iron paddle-steamer which served with the Isle of Man Steam Packet Company, and was the second vessel in the Company to bear the name.

She was the third of three sisters to come from the Greenock yards of Caird & Co., her two older siblings being Snaefell and Douglas.

Dimensions.
Length 240'; beam 26'; depth 14'.

Service life.

Built by Caird & Co of Greenock, and launched on Saturday 17 March 1866, Tynwald cost the Company £26,000 (equivalent to £ in ).
Both funnels were situated aft of the paddle boxes, with the main mast close to the after funnel.

Tynwald and her sisters were considered fast vessels. Indeed, her older sister Snaefell, is recorded as having made the passage from Douglas to Liverpool in 4hrs 20 minutes, which would suggest a speed in excess of 15 knots. On 15 June 1873, Tynwald collided with the steamship Sirius and the tug Guiding Star in the Sloyne. On 6 October 1874, she collided with the sailing ship Annie Frost in the River Mersey. Tynwald answered her distress signal and towed Cerdic in to Liverpool.

In 1882 Tynwald had a thorough overhaul. She was fitted with new boilers, surface condenser and new decks, which with repairs to the engines cost £11,219 (equivalent to £ in ). The next day she discovered Gloriosa derelict and towed her in to Douglas.

Tynwald was designed to carry a mixture of passengers and cargo. Her designation as a Royal Mail Ship (RMS) indicated that she carried mail under contract with the Royal Mail. A specified area was allocated for the storage of letters, parcels and specie (bullion, coins and other valuables). In addition, there was a considerable quantity of regular cargo, ranging from furniture to foodstuffs.

Disposal
After an uneventful career, Tynwald was disposed of in 1888.

Both Tynwald and her older sister Douglas were sold at auction, and raised the combined sum of £26,644 (equivalent to £ in ).

Official number and code letters 
Official numbers are issued by individual flag states. They should not be confused with IMO ship identification numbers. Tynwald had the UK Official Number 45474 and used the Code Letters H R T J .

References

Bibliography
 Chappell, Connery (1980). Island Lifeline T.Stephenson & Sons Ltd 

Ships of the Isle of Man Steam Packet Company
Ferries of the Isle of Man
1866 ships
Steamships
Paddle steamers of the United Kingdom
Steamships of the United Kingdom
Merchant ships of the United Kingdom
Ships built on the River Clyde
Maritime incidents in June 1873
Maritime incidents in October 1874